Happy Zero is a Hong Kong based Thoroughbred racehorse.

In the season of 2009-2010, he won the HKG1 Queen's Silver Jubilee Cup. He also is one of the nominees of Hong Kong Horse of the Year.

Profile
 Sire:  Danzero
 Dam: Have Love
 Dam's Sire: Canny Lad
 Sex: Gelding
 Country : 
 Colour :  Brown
 Owner :  David Philip Boehm 
 Trainer : John Moore
 Record : (No. of 1-2-3-Starts) 8-1-3-17 (As of 27 February 2012)
 Earnings :  HK$13,509,426 (As of 27 February 2012)

References
 The Hong Kong Jockey Club – Happy Zero Racing Record
 The Hong Kong Jockey Club

Racehorses trained in Hong Kong
Hong Kong racehorses
Racehorses bred in New Zealand
Thoroughbred family 1-u